The Air Route Surveillance Radar is used by the United States Air Force and the Federal Aviation Administration to control airspace within and around the borders of the United States.

The ARSR-4 is the FAA's most recent (late 1980s, early 1990s) addition to the "Long Range" series of radars, a solid state Westinghouse system with a  range.  In addition, the ARSR-4 features a "look down" capability that enables the radar to detect aircraft attempting to elude detection by flying at low altitudes, advanced clutter reduction via hardware and software post-processing, and enhanced poor-weather detection of aircraft. A Beacon system, the ATCBI-6M (a monopulse system), is installed along with each ARSR-4.  However, since the ARSR-4 is a 3D radar, it is capable of determining aircraft altitude independently of its associated Beacon (albeit less accurately).

ARSR-4 systems are installed along the borders and coastal areas of the continental United States, Guantanamo Bay Naval Base in Cuba, the municipality of Yigo on Guam, and a training site at the FAA's Mike Monroney Aeronautical Center in Oklahoma City. They are generally unmanned, being equipped with remote monitoring of both the radar data and the status of the radar's health and environment. That has been over the years expanded to numerous additional sites throughout the entire Continental US or CONUS.

History
The ARSR-2 was developed in the 1960s as a replacement for the ARSR-1, also operating in the L-band with a 200-mile range. From a users perspective the ARSR-1 and ARSR-2 function nearly identically. Components which had proved troublesome in the ARSR-1 were redesigned in order to improve the reliability of the ARSR-2. Existing ARSR-1 systems were then retrofitted with the more reliable ARSR-2 components. All ARSR-1/2 systems have been replaced With modern Common ARSR systems. Electron tubes like the one Vice President Gore used in a televised interview to symbolize the need for FAA modernization were still in use nationwide prior to the Common ARSR upgrade.

All ARSR-1/2s were replaced by the Common ARSR by the end of 2015. Common ARSR is abbreviated as CARSR. The CARSR has a  range, and shares transmitter components and software with the FAA's newest airport surveillance radar the ASR-11. Like the ASR-11, the CARSR is a completely solid state RADAR.

The Westinghouse-built ARSR-3 and 3D search radar was used by the FAA in the Joint Surveillance System (JSS). The radar operated in the L-band at 1250 to 1350 MHz and detected targets at a distance beyond . The D model had height-finder capability.

The Westinghouse-(now Northrop-Grumman)-ARSR-4 built 3-D air surveillance radar in the 1990s for the JSS. By the late 1990s, this radar had replaced most of the 1960s-vintage AN/FPS-20 variant search radars and a number of ARSR-3 search radars under a project termed the "FAA/Air Force Radar Replacement" (FARR) program.

References

Further reading

 ARSR-1,2,3,4 @ radomes.org 

Ground radars
Military radars of the United States
Radars of the United States Air Force
Aviation in the United States
Air traffic control in North America